Hercules was the name of a large number of steamships.
, built for the Chester and Holyhead railway, later acquired by the  London and North Western Railway.
, built for Dampfschiffahrts-Gesellschaft Neptun, Bremen. In service 1888–89
, built for Dampfschiffahrts-Gesellschaft Neptun. In service 1903–14
, built for the London Brighton and South Coast Railway as SS Brittany. Renamed Hercules in 1936
, built for Dampfschiffahrts-Gesellschaft Neptun. In service 1929–45.
For other ships named Hercules see the following entries on the Miramar website (subscription required). These may be sailing ships, steam ships or motor vessels.
(1822–98),  (1898–1911), (1911–76) and (1977 on)

Ship names